Restaurant James Sommerin was a restaurant in Penarth, Vale of Glamorgan, Wales. It was owned and run by chef James Sommerin. 

Sommerin formerly ran the Michelin starred The Crown and Whitebrook in Monmouthshire.

Description
The Edwardian Beachcliff building was purposely re-built to become Restaurant James Sommerin by Richard Hayward Properties. It was located off the Penarth esplanade, looking out across the Severn Estuary. In 2016 nine 'boutique' bedrooms were added to the restaurant, to accommodate diners travelling from afar.

The seafront restaurant closed in the summer of 2020 following months of COVID-19 lockdowns without financial assistance. Sommerin had planned to start a delivery service, but aborted the plan and instead made 1,000 meals for NHS staff with the food stocks. A year after the closure, Sommerin started a new venture called Home, in Stanwell Road, Penarth.

References

Restaurants in Wales
Restaurants established in 2014
Restaurants disestablished in 2020
Penarth
Michelin Guide starred restaurants in the United Kingdom